Lidia Selikhova (19 March 1922 – 7 February 2003) was a Soviet female speed skater. She won a gold medal at the World Allround Speed Skating Championships for Women in 1952, and again a gold medal in 1954.

References

External links

 

1922 births
2003 deaths
Soviet female speed skaters
World Allround Speed Skating Championships medalists